Sofya Andreyevna Tartakova (born 17 June 1989, Moscow) is a Russian radio and TV presenter, journalist and sports commentator of Match TV.

Biography
In  autumn of 2009 she worked as a correspondent in the newspaper Sovetsky Sport, wrote articles on the topic of tennis.

In 2011 she graduated from the Humanities Institute of Television and Radio Broadcasting. The commentator of tennis matches on  channels Eurosport Russia and NTV Plus Tennis, the author and presenter of  program  Central Court  on the radio station Sport FM.

For the first time as a TV presenter, Sofya Tartakova appeared in February 2014 in the program Olympic Channel from Sochi  on the TV channel  Sport Plus as co-host with Georgy Cherdantsev. Commented on the Wimbledon tennis tournament in 2014 on the Internet portal Sports.ru.

Formerly a press attache with the Russian Tennis Federation.

In October 2015, he moved to the new sports TV channel   Match TV.

In May 2017, she starred for the men's Maxim Magazine along with colleagues from Match TV Maria Bass and Yulia Sharapova. In June 2018 Tartakova graced the issue of the Russian edition of Playboy.

She is married to Russian tennis player Stepan Khotulev.

References

External links
 Софья Тартакова. Интервью о теннисе, работе и жизни.

1989 births
Living people
Sportspeople from Moscow
Tennis commentators
Russian sports journalists
Russian television presenters
Russian radio personalities
Russian women journalists
Russian women television presenters